Andy Roddick was the defending champion, but lost in the quarterfinals to Sam Querrey.
Sam Querrey won in the final 6–7(3–7), 7–6(7–5), 6–3, against John Isner.

Seeds

Draw

Finals

Top half

Bottom half

Qualifying

Seeds

Qualifiers

Draw

First qualifier

Second qualifier

Third qualifier

Fourth qualifier

External links
Main Draw
Qualifying Draw

Singles
2010 ATP World Tour
2010 in sports in Tennessee